Minhaj Jalill  (born 9 January 1995) is a Sri Lankan cricketer. He made his first-class debut for Tamil Union Cricket and Athletic Club in the 2014–15 Premier Trophy on 19 March 2015. He made his Twenty20 debut for Saracens Sports Club in the 2017–18 SLC Twenty20 Tournament on 24 February 2018.

References

External links
 

1995 births
Living people
Sri Lankan cricketers
Galle Cricket Club cricketers
Galle District cricketers
Saracens Sports Club cricketers
Tamil Union Cricket and Athletic Club cricketers
Cricketers from Colombo